Louisiana v. United States, 380 U.S. 145 (1965), was a case decided by the Supreme Court of the United States that dealt with an "interpretation test" permitted by the Louisiana Constitution of 1921 alleged to deprive Louisiana Negroes of voting rights in violation of 42 U.S.C. Section 1971(a) and the Fourteenth and Fifteenth Amendments.

The test gave complete discretion to registrars to deny an applicant the ability to register to vote if he could not "give a reasonable interpretation" of any clause in the Louisiana Constitution or the Constitution of the United States.

See also
 List of United States Supreme Court cases, volume 380

External links

1965 in United States case law
African-American history of Louisiana
History of voting rights in the United States
Legal history of Louisiana
Louisiana elections
United States Fifteenth Amendment case law
United States Supreme Court cases
United States Supreme Court cases of the Warren Court